The Golden Transcript is the second oldest newspaper in Colorado, behind the Central City Register-Call. The Transcript is also the oldest media outlet of the Denver metropolitan area.  It is published by Mile High Newspapers in Golden, Colorado.

History
This newspaper was established as the Colorado Transcript in Golden on December 19, 1866. It was begun by George West, one of the founding fathers of Golden, who came west as leader of the Boston Company during the Colorado Gold Rush in 1859. West began his journalistic career as an apprentice of the newspaper of Claremont, New Hampshire, continuing as a journalist at the Boston Transcript. After coming west, he fortuitously helped William N. Byers publish the first extra edition of the Rocky Mountain News on June 11, 1859, and then (with his partners in the Boston Company) established Colorado's fourth newspaper, the Western Mountaineer, in Golden on December 4, 1859. After that newspaper ceased operating in 1860, West fought with the Union Army in the American Civil War, and resumed his journalistic career as Local Editor of the News in 1865. With money West saved he established Colorado's eighth newspaper, and Golden's third newspaper, in 1866. He named it the Transcript after his old newspaper, the Boston Transcript, which published from 1830 to 1941 on Milk Street across from the Old South Meeting House in Boston. The namesake has now outlived the 110-year career of the original.

Originally a weekly, the Transcript would continue publishing along this line for a century. Its founder remained at the helm for 40 years, a remarkable accomplishment in Colorado journalism, until his death in 1906. An ardent Democrat, West used his paper often to promote Democratic candidates and causes. He also was a tireless promoter of Golden and constantly reported on and encouraged its growth and progress. Upon his death the newspaper passed to his son, Harley Dean West, a veteran of the Spanish–American War, and it remained in the West family for some years. During the 1960s the newspaper became a twice-weekly, three days a week, and finally a daily newspaper, publishing on weekdays throughout the 1970s. It resumed being twice weekly in the 1980s, and resumed being a weekly in the 2000s. Through the years the Transcript outlasted formidable competitors, including the Golden Globe (1872–1919); Jefferson County Republican (1919–46); and Golden Outlook (1940s–90s).

The Golden Transcript carries the remarkable distinction of having never missed an edition throughout its publishing history. This has been accomplished despite such adverse events as a major paper shortage that caused it to print on single sheets of wrapping paper in 1869 and a fire that struck it as a daily in 1978. As of December 24, 2009, the Transcript has published a total of 10,832 issues.

In May 2021, The Colorado Sun and nonprofit organization The National Trust for Local News became joint owners of The Golden Transcript along with over a dozen more local newspapers.

Homes of the Transcript
The Golden Transcript has been headquartered at five locations in Golden:
 Boston Building – 1005 Washington Avenue (1866–67; now destroyed)
 Loveland Block – 1225 Washington Avenue (1867–70; second building of that name, now destroyed)
 Transcript Building – 1115 Washington Avenue (1870–1967)
 Transcript Building – 1000 10th Street (1967–2007)
 ClickData Building – 110 North Rubey Drive (2007–2014)
 Washington Station – 722 Washington Avenue (2014–present)

In 1978, the Hesteds Building (1225 Washington Avenue; now destroyed) became the emergency quarters from which the Transcript was published after its headquarters was damaged by fire on November 4, 1978. Ironically, the paper was printed on exactly the same site as its second home.

Other Transcript publications
Over the years, companion editions of the Transcript have been published by its creators. These include Golden's original daily edition, reporting on the Colorado Territorial Legislature, published from 1866 to 1867; the Denver edition, published in 1875; and the Wheat Ridge edition (originally Jefferson County edition), published from 1982 to the present. These are considered distinct publications apart from the original Transcript.

References 

Newspapers published in Colorado
Weekly newspapers published in the United States
Transcript